Decodina is a genus of moths belonging to the family Tortricidae.

Species
Decodina mazatlana Powell, 1980

See also
List of Tortricidae genera

References

External links
tortricidae.com

Tortricidae genera